Andrea Saltelli is an Italian scholar studying quantification with statistical and sociological tools, extending the theory of sensitivity analysis to sensitivity auditing.

Bio
Saltelli received his degrees in inorganic chemistry from the Sapienza University of Rome in summer 1976.  He then worked at the Italian Nuclear Authority ENEA and for one year at the Argonne National Laboratory in the United States. Till 2015 he worked at the Joint Research Centre of the European Commission, leading for fifteen years a team devoted to econometrics and applied statistics. Between 2016 and 2020 he was associate professor at the Centre for the Study of the Sciences and the Humanities (Senter for vitenskapsteori) at the University of Bergen.

Works
Some authors  credit Andrea Saltelli for having given impulse to the field of uncertainty and sensitivity analysis, also via the creation of the SAMO conference series started in 1995,  and two handbooks, one of which translated in Chinese. In these and other works he introduced the concepts of global sensitivity analysis, and total sensitivity indices, helping to disseminate the variance-based sensitivity analysis work of the Russian mathematician Ilya M. Sobol, with whom he collaborated. His formulae for computing efficiently the variance based sensitivity indices have been considered useful by practitioners.  He has worked on climate change, ranking of higher education, the ecological footprint, and composite indicators. More recent works are on the reproducibility of scientific results, principles for mathematical modelling and on ethics of quantification.

Andrea Saltelli has collaborated with Silvio Funtowicz, Jerome R. Ravetz and Jeroen van der Sluijs on theories and applications of post-normal science. He also worked with the Belgian sociologist Paul-Marie Boulanger on the application of the theories on Niklas Luhmann to the reproducibility crisis in scientific research and to the COVID-19 pandemic, with the Norwegian economist Erik Reinert on themes related to quantification in economics, and with Daniel Sarewitz on the post-truth debate.

Thought
In an interview for ‘The Corbet Report’, Andrea Saltelli noted his early fascination with the production of quantified evidence via statistical or mathematical modelling and his puzzlement to see how easy it was to produce evidence of a poor quality, or altogether to cheat or deceive with numbers. The attention to responsible production of numbers led him to his involvement into issues of epistemology, philosophy of science, and science for policy.
This motivated him to extend the theory of sensitivity analysis to sensitivity auditing, which aims to provide an assessment of the entire knowledge- and model-generating process, inclusive of explicit or implicit assumptions, interests, stakes and motivations of the developers. According to existing guidelines including from the European Commission, sensitivity auditing becomes relevant when the results from a modelling exercise feed into a political decision process.

Books 
A. Saltelli, K. Chan, and M. Scott, Sensitivity analysis. Wiley, 2000.
A. Saltelli, S. Tarantola, F. Campolongo, and M. Ratto, Sensitivity Analysis in Practice. Chichester, UK: John Wiley & Sons, Ltd, 2004.
A. Saltelli et al., Global sensitivity analysis : the primer. John Wiley, 2008.

References

External links

Profile on University of Bergen website

ORCID

Videos
Regulatory capture in the name of Enlightenment, Post-normal science Symposium, September 25, 2020.
Sensitivity analysis, an introduction, Closing keynote at the 2019 ENBIS conference in Budapest, September 4, 2019, Pázmány Péter sétány 1/C, Budapest.
Interview with the Corbet Report, The Crisis of Science, March 6, 2019.
Webinar at Centre for Science and Technology Studies  (CWTS), Leiden University, February 5, 2021: 'Ethics of quantification', with Andrea Saltelli, Wendy Espeland, & Andy Stirling. 
Ethics of quantification, Video curated by the Open University of Catalonia, September 2021. 

1953 births
Living people
Italian statisticians
People from Rome
Sapienza University of Rome alumni